Syrup (1999) is Max Barry's debut novel. Written under the pseudonym Maxx Barry, the novel satirizes consumerism and marketing techniques. It was adapted into the 2013 film Syrup.

Main characters
Scat – Protagonist, a recent marketing graduate, the original creator of Fukk.
Sneaky Pete – Antagonist, Scat's college friend, former roommate, and eventual boss.
6 – Scat's partner and love interest, a marketing executive.
Cindy – Scat's on again off again girlfriend, later named Babe-A-Licious.
Tina – 6's roommate, a film student.

Plot
Set in the present day, a young marketing graduate named Scat comes up with an idea for a new product for Coca-Cola called 'Fukk'. He approaches Coca-Cola to sell his idea for $3 million but finds that Sneaky Pete has already claimed the trademark. Scat then leaves his apartment with Sneaky Pete and moves in with Cindy. Cindy eventually throws him out and he goes to live with 6 and Tina while managing the summer marketing campaign for Coca-Cola.  He eventually succeeds with the campaign. After that Scat tries to undermine Sneaky Pete's effort to run a new secret project for Coca-Cola, the first feature length advertising movie.

Coca-Cola Blāk
In 2006 Coca-Cola introduced a coffee-flavored soft drink called Coca-Cola BlāK. It was first released in France in a black can. Barry commented on the similarities of this and his fictional Coca-Cola Fukk from the novel on his blog.

Release details
1999, UK, Viking Press, Pub date ? July 1999, hardback (First edition)
2000, UK, Penguin Books, Pub date ? July 2000, paperback

References

External links
Syrup at Max Barry's website

1999 Australian novels
Australian novels adapted into films
Coca-Cola in popular culture
Novels about consumerism
Novels by Max Barry
Australian satirical novels
Viking Press books
Works published under a pseudonym
1999 debut novels